Vassilis Christou Rapotikas (1888–1943;) was an Aromanian revolutionary and collaborationist paramilitary leader in Greece during World War II. He was among leaders of the Roman Legion of the short-lived Italian puppet state of Pindus, right behind Alcibiades Diamandi and Nicolaos Matussis. This unit sought to carve out a permanent and independent Aromanian state in the Greek regions of Thessaly and Macedonia. Rapotikas was killed in May or June 1943 by members of the Greek People's Liberation Army near Grizano.

References

1888 births
1943 deaths
Aromanian people
Aromanian nationalists
Aromanian military personnel
Aromanian revolutionaries
Greek collaborators with Fascist Italy
Separatists
Greek people of Aromanian descent
Aromanians from the Ottoman Empire
People from Kastoria (regional unit)